The Southern District or South District may refer to:

Government

Africa
 Southern District (Botswana)
 Southern District Municipality, South Africa
 South District (Zanzibar)

Asia
 Southern District, Hong Kong
 Southern District (Israel)
 South District, Taichung, Taiwan
 South District, Tainan, Taiwan
 For Southern Districts (ku) in Japanese cites see Minami-ku
 For Southern Districts (gu) in Korean cites see Nam-gu

Australia
 Southern District (South Australian Legislative Council), an electoral district 1882–1975

Religion
 Southern District (LCMS) in the Lutheran Church - Missouri Synod

See also
, for U.S. judicial districts containing "Southern District"